Frank McEachran (1900–1975), sometimes known as Kek, was a British schoolmaster and writer. He taught at English public schools and the University of Leipzig and wrote on philosophy, but his most commercially successful books were his anthologies Spells for Poets and More Spells which appeared in the 1950s. He was an active proponent of Georgism.

Life
The son of an engineer from Wolverhampton, McEachran was educated at Manchester Grammar School and then at Magdalen College, Oxford. After taking the degrees of BA and BLitt, he began to teach at Gresham's School, Holt, in September 1924. Among the boys he influenced while there was the future poet W. H. Auden, and one writer on Auden detects traces of McEachran's "humanist world-view" in Auden's poetry until it was overtaken by the existentialism of Kierkegaard in the 1940s. McEachran also taught the future communist James Klugmann, and the writer Alan Bennett used him as the model for the character of the schoolmaster Hector in his play The History Boys.

He was most notably a schoolmaster at Shrewsbury, but later a lecturer at the University of Leipzig. At Shrewsbury he taught Martin Wainwright, who has recalled that "Frank McEachran stood us on chairs at school reciting poetry we’d learned by heart. Probably child abuse these days, but he called it Spells and I can still remember them all." He is remembered in Shrewsbury School through the McEachran room in the English faculty where the student-run Creative Writing Society meets, some still influenced by his writings.

McEachran's anthology Spells (1953), later re-issued as Spells for Poets, is divided into eight parts: 'Sheer', 'Queer', 'Fear', 'Love', 'Death', 'Odd', 'God', and 'Postscript'.

McEachran died in 1975 in Shrewsbury.

Selected publications
The Civilized Man (1930)
The Destiny of Europe (1932)
Two diaries: Greece, Russia, 1934
'Henry George and Karl Marx', a paper presented at the International Conference, London, September, 1936
The Life and Philosophy of Johann Gottfried Herder (1939)
Freedom – the Only End (Johnson Publications Limited, London, 1966)
On Translating Nietzsche into English
Spells for Poets: an Anthology of Words and Comment (Basil Blackwell, 1955; Garnstone Press paperback edition, 1974)
More Spells: a New Anthology of Words and Comment (Garnstone Press)
A Cauldron of Spells (posthumous collection, with introduction by Laurence Le Quesne; Greenbank Press, 1992)

Notes

External links
Frank McEachran, "... will not find easy acceptance", paper presented at the 13th International Conference on Land Value Taxation and Free Trade, Douglas, Isle of Man, September 1973 (online text)

.

1900 births
1975 deaths
People educated at Manchester Grammar School
Alumni of Magdalen College, Oxford
Academic staff of Leipzig University
20th-century British philosophers
Georgists